Woman III is a painting by abstract expressionist painter Willem de Kooning. It is one of a series of six  Women paintings done by de Kooning in the early 1950's, which were first exhibited at the Sidney Janis gallery in 1953. "Woman III" measures  and was completed that same year.

From late 1970s to 1994 this painting was part of Tehran Museum of Contemporary Art collection. After the Iranian Revolution in 1979, the painting could not be shown because of strict rules set by the government about the visual arts and acceptable subject matter. Finally, in 1994, the painting was acquired by collector Thomas Ammann and subsequently traded to collector David Geffen for part of a 16th century Persian manuscript, the Shahnameh of Shah Tahmasp.

In November 2006, the painting was sold by Geffen to billionaire Steven A. Cohen for $137.5 million.  It is currently the fourteenth most expensive painting ever bought, and the only of de Koonings early Woman series not held in a public collection.

Visual Analysis
Woman III is notable within the series for its more muted palette of grays and whites. The body, outlined in arcs of black, is more voluminous than flat as in other Women paintings; here the chest and arms bulge towards the viewer assertively, and the figure stands decisively apart from the background.  The features of Woman III's mask-like face are clearly rendered; the enormous eyes, nose and smile are crudely drawn and framed by slashes of blonde hair.

See also
List of most expensive paintings
Thomas Ammann

References

External links
New York Times article
Artnet image page

1953 paintings
Paintings by Willem de Kooning
Portraits of women